Events in the year 2000 in Namibia.

Incumbents 

 President: Sam Nujoma
 Prime Minister: Hage Geingob
 Chief Justice of Namibia: Johan Strydom

Events 

 10 – 28 July – The J.G.A. Diergaardt (late Captain of the Rehoboth Baster Community) et al. v. Namibia case was decided by the United Nations Human Rights Committee.

Deaths

References 

 
2000s in Namibia
Years of the 21st century in Namibia
Namibia
Namibia